The 1926 Tour de Hongrie was the second edition of the Tour de Hongrie cycle race and was held from 27 to 29 June 1926. The race started and finished in Budapest. The race was won by László Vida.

Route

General classification

References

1926
Tour de Hongrie
Tour de Hongrie